The 44th Pennsylvania House of Representatives District is located in southwest Pennsylvania and has been represented since 2019 by Valerie Gaydos.

District profile
The 44th District is located in Allegheny County and includes the following areas:

 Aleppo Township
 Bell Acres
 Crescent Township
 Edgeworth
 Findlay Township
 Glen Osborne
 Glenfield
 Haysville
Leet Township
Leetsdale
 Moon Township
 North Fayette Township
 Sewickley
 Sewickley Heights
 Sewickley Hills

Representatives

Recent election results

References

External links
District map from the United States Census Bureau
Pennsylvania House Legislative District Maps from the Pennsylvania Redistricting Commission.  
Population Data for District 44 from the Pennsylvania Redistricting Commission.

Government of Allegheny County, Pennsylvania
44